National School of Drama (NSD) is a theatre training institute situated at New Delhi, India. It is an autonomous organization under Ministry of Culture, Government of India. It was set up in 1959 by the Sangeet Natak Akademi and became an independent school in 1975. In 2005, it was granted deemed university status, but in 2011 it was revoked. Paresh Rawal is the current Chairperson of 
National School of Drama (NSD).

History
The origins of the school can be traced back to a seminar in 1954, where the idea of a Central institution for theatre was mooted, subsequently, a draft scheme was prepared in 1955, and the Sangeet Natak Akademi, which had Jawaharlal Nehru as its president, started drawing plans for the institution. Meanwhile, elsewhere in Delhi, Bharatiya Natya Sangh (BNS) with assistance from UNESCO, independently established the 'Asian Theatre Institute' (ATI) on 20 January 1958, and in July 1958, ATI was taken over by the Sangeet Natak Akademi (SNA), India's National Academy of Music, dance and drama of Government of India.

In the following year, the government merged it with the newly founded school, and thus NSD was established in April 1959 under the auspices of Sangeet Natak Akademi. Initially, the school was situated at Nizamuddin West and was called 'National School of Drama and Asian Theatre Institute, whose first batch passed out in 1961. During his tenure as the director of the institution, Ebrahim Alkazi (1962–1977), not just overhauled the syllabus, but also had the students dig and build platforms for a theatre in the backyard of a rented Kailash Colony house, where NSD had moved. Later when it moved to its present location, he also designed two theatres for NSD, including a 200-seat studio theatre, and the open-air Meghdoot theatre, under a banyan tree.

In 1975 it became an autonomous organization, under the erstwhile Ministry of Education and Ministry of Culture, Department of Culture, with the name 'National School of Drama' and relocated in May 1975, to its present premises at Bahawalpur House, the residence of Bahawalpur a former princely state. However, the place is generally known by adjacent (now demolished) Mandi House, the former residence of Raja of erstwhile Mandi princely state. In 1999, the school organized its first National Theatre Festival, 'Bharat Rang Mahotsav', generally held during the second week of January each year.

In 2008, the institution celebrated its golden jubilee at its annual theatre festival, Bharat Rang Mahotsav, with a gathering of its alumni from all over the country, the festival's satellite edition in Mumbai showcased plays of NSD graduates, including Ratan Thiyam's Prologue, Bansi Kaul (Aranyadhipati Tantiya), Neelam Mansingh Chowdhury (The Suit), Sanjay Upadhyay (Harsingar), Baharul Islam (Akash), Mohan Maharishi (Dear Bapu) and M K Raina (Stay Yet Awhile). Waman Kendre was appointed as Director the school in 2013. He will serve a five-year term. He has done post-graduate with research in folk theatre of Kerala from NSD. He belongs to the nomadic Vanjara tribal community of Marathwada and was one of the leading lights of the Dalit theatre movement in Maharashtra in the late 1970s. As of 10 September 2020 Paresh Rawal, has been appointed as the Chairman of the National School of Drama.

Deemed university status
On 16 March 2005, the Government of India granted the NSD the status of deemed university. However, in 2010 the NSD Society asked for the deemed university status to be revoked since "[it] could undermine the professional training, autonomy, and flexibility required in the creative fields such as theatre." Thus, in October 2011, the status was revoked on request of NSD.

Performing Wings

Repertory Company

The professional performing wing of NSD, the 'National School of Drama' Repertory Company was set up in 1964, with an aim to promote professional theatre in India. Its first head was Om Shivpuri, followed by Manohar Singh, Ram Gopal Bajaj (Acting Chief), J.N. Kaushal (Acting Chief), Anuradha Kapur (Acting Chief), and [Suresh Sharma], Sagar Kamble, Atul Singhai (Animation chief).

Today, the Repertory Company has staged over 120 plays based on the works of about 70 playwrights and featuring around 50 directors in several countries, and various cities across the nation, and has its own festival every year called 'Annual Repertory Company Summer Festival', in which it performs new and past plays. In 2004, the repertory celebrated its 40th anniversary with a theatre festival in New Delhi.

Sanskaar Rang Toli
In 1989 NSD established the 'Theatre-in-Education Company' (T.I.E), called 'Sanskaar Rang Toli', which coaches children aged 8 to 16 years. The company regularly performs plays for school and adult audiences alike, and has its own yearly theatre festivals, 'Jashn-e-Bachpan' and Bal Sangam.

Performing spaces
The school has three auditoria within the campus:

 Abhimanch Auditorium
 Sammukh Auditorium
 Bahumukh Auditorium

Apart from that, it has a studio theatre and minor performances spaces used on special occasions, like the Bharat Rangmahotsav.

Regional centres

In a bid to decentralize its activities, NSD opened Regional Resource Centres (RRC) across India, the first of which was opened at Bengaluru in 1994. A new centre was established in Varanasi.

Bharat Rang Mahotsav

Bharat Rang Mahotsav, or the 'National Theatre Festival', established in 1999, is the annual theatre festival of National School of Drama (NSD), held in New Delhi, today it is acknowledged as the largest theatre festival of Asia, dedicated solely to theatre. The School also organizes a festival showcasing tribal traditions, the Adirang Mahotsav.

Extension Program 

 Extension Programmes, through which NSD staff and alumni conduct workshops in various parts of the nation, were established in 1978 and have since conducted workshops and programmes for adults and children throughout the country, including some in Nepal, Sikkim, Ladakh, and Bhutan. Since its inception in 1980, the Traditional Theatrical Project has regularly allowed creative contact between traditional and contemporary theatre performers. Along with providing an introduction to theatre, these programmes aim to help participants develop their personalities and broaden their emotional horizons.

Extension Centers 

 Sikkim Center
 Bengaluru Center
 TIE Wings Tripura
 Varanasi Center

Northeast Extension Programme 
The National School of Drama's Extension Programme connects the school in Delhi to other regional theatres around the country. The school has been imparting training and creating plays with theatre practitioners all throughout the country through a series of well-planned theatrical workshops that take into account the individual demands of each location. These courses instruct those who cannot afford to spend three years at NSD and those who have been practising theatre for a long time.

The school also builds contact with a significant number of theatrical groups and organizations that are performing good work in the regions through collaborative projects through this programme.

NSD has recently arranged a series of theatre workshops in the Northeastern States as part of its Extension Programme. The workshops followed a three-step programme: the first was to pique all participants' interest in the complexities of the theatre experience - performance and transference; the second was to impart training in the area; and the third was to assist and guide them in preparing productions based on the received training. Once the productions were completed, participants were given the opportunity to present ten shows in various sections of the region in order to build self-confidence, a variety of experience, and audience engagement. Finally, the School decided to provide a forum to present these creations, which is how the Poorvottar Natya Samaroh was born.

The first Poorvottar Natya Samaroh took place in Guwahati in 2007, followed by the second in Gangtok, Sikkim, in 2008. The plays in the Poorvottar Natya Samaroh covered a wide range of topics, including romance, social issues such as caste and gender, exploitation in a feudal system, survival and hope in a conflict-torn societal milieu, philosophical ideas, and resistance.

This combination of theatre experiences will not only allow for the mixing of all those engaged, but the spectrum of representation and performance will also highlight varied styles of portrayal, each as valid as the other. The festival seeks to provide a space of meaningful interaction and involvement for all by emphasizing this oneness in the variety of human life and existence.

Publications 

 Some major Books and Journals of NSD:

 Theatre India
 Rang Prasang
 Raj Bhasha Munjusha (19th Edition)
 Raj Bhasha Munjusha (20th Edition)
 Rang Manch

Notable alumni
Several NSD alumni have gone on to achieve national recognition for their work on stage, television and film. The following is a partial listing as provided by the school's website.

Directors of NSD

NSD has had eleven directors since its establishment in 1959:

Molestation allegation 
In August 2018, a woman student alleged molestation – that she was inappropriately touched by National School of Drama's guest professor Suresh Shetty during the entrance workshop. The accused professor was a retired Academics Dean of NSD.

See also
 Theatre of India
 Ebrahim Alkazi
 Ninasam
 Bhartendu Natya Academy
 Biju Pattnaik Film and Television Institute of Odisha
 Government Film and Television Institute
 Film and Television Institute of India
 Satyajit Ray Film and Television Institute
 State Institute of Film and Television
 Madhya Pradesh School of Drama
Kalabhavan

References

Further reading
 Rang yatra: twenty-five years of the National School of Drama Repertory Company, by National School of Drama. Published by National School of Drama, 1992.

External links
 Official NSD (National School of Drama) website
  Official Bharat Rang Mahotsav website

 NSD Alumni – Activities and Associations

 
Drama schools in India
Film schools in India
Universities and colleges in Delhi
Arts organisations based in Delhi
Arts organizations established in 1959
Educational institutions established in 1959
1959 establishments in Delhi
Performing arts education in India
Theatre in India